Olena Oleksiivna Lytovchenko (1 May 1963 – 28 October 2021) was a Ukrainian writer and a metallurgical engineer by education. She wrote and co-authored with her husband Timur Litovchenko adventures, historical fiction, and detective fiction which books were published in Ukraine.

Biography 
Olena Oleksiivna Litovchenko was born on May 1, 1963, in Tashkent. Her father was a pilot and worked as a flight engineer in transport aviation. Until coming of age, she roamed not only in Ukraine, but also in Russia (Tyumen, Kurgan).

In 1980, she completed her secondary education. In 1986, she graduated from Igor Sikorsky Kyiv Polytechnic Institute's department of engineering and physics with a degree in metallurgical engineering. While studying there she met her future husband and co-author Timur.

Lytovchenko died on 28 October 2021, of COVID-19. She was 58.

Personal life 

Olena's husband Timur Litovchenko was born in 1963 in Kyiv, and they were married in 1984. She coauthored literary works with him since 2011. They have one daughter Ludmila who was born in 1985.
Her father is from Motovylivka and her mother is from the Wuhanski noble family, who lived in the present-day Gmina Uchanie of Hrubieszów County, in Lublin Voivodeship, eastern Poland.

Literary career 
As a teenager, a number of poems by Olena Lytovchenko were published in the Periodical Press of Kurgan, Russia. During her studies at KPI and after that she sometimes wrote short stories in the genre of fantasy. A completely new stage began in 2011, when Olena and her husband Timur Litovchenko began to write historical prose together. The novels of the creative Litovchenko couple were published by the Folio Publishing House of Kharkiv.

Olena Lytovchenko also created a series of stories about pets in the family reading genre, one of which was included in the collection "Druzi nezradlyvi" (winners of the contest "Mi-mi-mi. Our favorites"), which was published by Staryi Lev Publishing House.

From 2018 to 2021, the Litovchenko couple had the miniseries "101 Years of Ukraine" published by the Folio Publishing House of Kharkiv. In 2018, the first four books in the series were printed. In 2019, three more novels were published. In 2020, two more books were published. Their last book was published in 2021.

Honors 
2011 - Nomination for the Prize of the President of Ukraine "Ukrainian Book of the Year."
2012 - Special Award "Publishers' Choice" at the All-Ukrainian Literary Competition "Coronation of the Word 2012" (together with her husband, Timur Litovchenko). 
2012 - All-Ukrainian Literary and Artistic Festival "Prosto na Pokrovu" (Korosten) - diploma "Gyenyu Svyata."
2012 - Nomination for the BBC Book of the Year Award.
2012 - Nomination for the Prize of the President of Ukraine "Ukrainian Book of the Year."
2013 - All-Ukrainian Literary Competition named after Alexandra Kravchenko, 2nd place (with Timur Litovchenko) for the novel about Kirill Razumovski "Pustotsvit."
2014 - Nomination for the BBC Book of the Year Award.
2014 - Nomination for the Prize of the President of Ukraine "Ukrainian Book of the Year."
2016 - Literary award "Golden Writer of Ukraine" (special award of the International Literary Competition "Coronation of the Word 2016") and the "Sword of the Word" (with Timur Litovchenko).
2016 - Vasyl Yukhymovich Prize for the prose book "Fatalʹna pomylka" (with Timur Litovchenko).
2017 - Diploma at the International Literary Competition "Coronation of the Word 2017" for the book "Prince of Ukraine" (with Timur Litovchenko).
2018 - Panteleimon Kulish Prize (together with Timur Litovchenko) "for historical novels."
2018 - The work of Timur and Olena Litovchenko "Knyha Zhakhittya. 1932-1938," published by Folio Publishing House, won the Best Book of Ukraine competition in the My Country category, according to the State Committee for Television and Radio-broadcasting (Ukraine).
2019 - Diploma of the All-Ukrainian literary competition of prose Ukrainian-language publications "Dnipro-Book-Fest-2019" (with Timur Litovchenko) in the nomination "Prose works (novels, short stories)" for the book "Prince of Ukraine" about Danylo Skoropadskyi, son of Hetman of Ukraine Pavlo Skoropadskyi.

Published works

Ukrainian 
 Пустоцвіт//Серія «Історія України в романах» — Харків: Фоліо. 2012. — 378 с. 
  Pustotsvit//Series "The History of Ukraine in Novels," Kharkiv: Folio. 2012. - 378 p. 
 Пустоцвіт (роман). — Київ: Гетьман, 2013. — 376 с. 
  Pustotsvit (novel). — Kyiv: Hetman, 2013. — 376 p. 
 Кинджал проти шаблі//Серія «Історія України в романах» — Харків: Фоліо. 2012. — 315 с. 
  Kindzhal proti shabli//Series «The History of Ukraine in Novels» — Kharkiv: Folio. 2012. — 315 p. 
 Кинджал проти шаблі (роман). — Харків: Гімназія, 2013. — 313 с. 
  Kindzhal proti shabli (novel). — Kharkiv: Himnaziya, 2013. — 313 p. 
 Невиправдана зрада (повість)//В зб .: Історія України очима письменників. — Харків: Фоліо. 2013. — 510 с.  (сс.28-85)
  Nevipravdana zrada (povist) in the collection: History of Ukraine through the eyes of writers. — Kharkiv: Folio. 2013. — 510 p.  (сс.28-85)
 Шалені шахи//Серія «Історія України в романах» — Харків: Фоліо. 2014. — 314 с. 
  Shaleni shakhy//Series «The History of Ukraine in Novels» — Kharkiv: Folio. 2014. — 314 p. 
 Забути неможливо зберегти Детектив/Бойовик/Трилер. — Харків: Фоліо. 2014. — 217 с. 
  Zabuty nemozhlyvo zberehty Detective/Action/Thriller. — Kharkiv: Folio. 2014. — 217 p. 
 Мрійник (повість)//В зб .: Україна — Європа. — Харків: Фоліо. 2014. — 573 с.  (сс.275-307)
  Mriynyk (povistʹ)//in the collection: Ukraine — Europe. — Kharkiv: Folio. 2014. — 573 p.  (сс.275-307)
 Фатальна помилка//Серія «Історія України в романах» — Харків: Фоліо. 2015. — 319 с. 
  Fatalʹna pomylka // Series «The History of Ukraine in Novels» — Kharkiv: Folio. 2015. — 319 p. 
 Фатальна помилка (авантюрно-історичний роман) — Харків: Факт, 2015. — 317 c. 
  Fatalʹna pomylka (adventure-historical novel) — Kharkiv: Fact, 2015. — 317 p. 
 Наш подільський дворик (цикл оповідань)//В зб .: Усмішка.//Серія «Добрі історії» — Харків: Фоліо. 2015. — 160 с. 
  Nash podilʹsʹkyy dvoryk (tsykl opovidanʹ)//in the collection: Usmishka.//Series «Good stories» — Kharkiv: Folio. 2015. — 160 p. 
 Принц України (історичний детектив) — Харків: Фоліо. 2017. — 320 с. 
  Prince of Ukraine (historical detective) — Kharkiv: Folio. 2017. — 320 p. 
 Книга Пожежі. 1914—1922//Серія «101 рік України» — Харків: Фоліо. 2018. — 256 с. 
  Knyha Pozhezhi. 1914—1922//Series «101 Years of Ukraine» — Kharkiv: Folio. 2018. — 256 p. 
 Книга Невиправданих Надій. 1923—1931//Серія «101 рік України» — Харків: Фоліо. 2018. — 272 с. 
  Knyha Nevypravdanykh Nadiy. 1923—1931//Series «101 Years of Ukraine» — Kharkiv: Folio. 2018. — 272 p. 
 Книга Жахіття. 1932—1938//Серія «101 рік України» — Харків: Фоліо. 2018. — 204 с. 
  Knyha Zhakhittya. 1932—1938//Series «101 Years of Ukraine» — Kharkiv: Folio. 2018. — 204 p. 
 Книга Спустошення. 1939—1945//Серія «101 рік України» — Харків: Фоліо. 2018. — 224 с. 
  Knyha Spustoshennya. 1939—1945//Series «101 Years of Ukraine» — Kharkiv: Folio. 2018. — 224 p. 
 Книга Зневіри. 1946—1953//Серія «101 рік України» — Харків: Фоліо. 2019. — 256 с. 
  Knyha Zneviry. 1946—1953//Series «101 Years of Ukraine» — Kharkiv: Folio. 2019. — 256 p. 
 Книга Відлиги. (1954—1964)//Серія «101 рік України» — Харків: Фоліо. 2019. — 352 с. 
  Knyha Vidlyhy. (1954—1964)//Series «101 Years of Ukraine» — Kharkiv: Folio. 2019. — 352 p. 
 Книга Застою. (1965—1976)//Серія «101 рік України» — Харків: Фоліо. 2019. — 384 с. 
  Knyha Zastoyu. (1965—1976)//Series «101 Years of Ukraine» — Kharkiv: Folio. 2019. — 384 p. 
 Книга Розчарування. (1977—1990)//Серія «101 рік України» — Харків: Фоліо. 2020. — 480 с. 
  Knyha Rozcharuvannya. (1977—1990)//Series «101 Years of Ukraine» — Kharkiv: Folio. 2020. — 480 p. 
 Книга Нових Сподівань. (2005—2014)//Серія «101 рік України» — Харків: Фоліо. 2020. — 416 с. 
  Knyha Novykh Spodivanʹ. (2005—2014)//Series «101 Years of Ukraine» — Kharkiv: Folio. 2020. — 416 p. 
 Книга Безнадії. (1991—2004)//Серія «101 рік України» — Харків: Фоліо. 2021. — 640 с. 
  Knyha Beznadiyi. (1991—2004)//Series «101 Years of Ukraine» — Kharkiv: Folio. 2021. — 640 p.

Notes

References

Sources 
 Modern Ukrainian Book Sphere | Olena Lytovchenko

External links 
 The Litovchenko Writers: There are many parallels with the present in "Pustotsvit"

1963 births
2021 deaths
Ukrainian women novelists
Historical novelists
Kyiv Polytechnic Institute alumni
Ukrainian novelists
20th-century Ukrainian women
21st-century Ukrainian women
Writers from Tashkent
Deaths from the COVID-19 pandemic in Ukraine